The 1897 Indiana Hoosiers football team was an American football team that represented Indiana University during the 1897 college football season. In their second season under head coach Madison G. Gonterman, the Hoosiers compiled a 6–1–1 record and outscored their opponents 150 to 32.

Schedule

References

Indiana
Indiana Hoosiers football seasons
Indiana Hoosiers football